Dibolia borealis, the northern plantain flea beetle, is a species of flea beetle in the family Chrysomelidae. It is found in North America.

References

Further reading

 
 

Alticini
Articles created by Qbugbot
Beetles described in 1834